"Respect the Power of Love" is Namie Amuro's 12th single on the Avex Trax label. Her second single to be released after her hiatus and taken her fourth studio album Genius 2000, The single was released on the same day that Amuro's mother was murdered. Amuro cancelled promotion for this single and flew to Okinawa to identify her mother's body.

Commercial tie-in 
Respect the Power of Love was used in Kose Visee commercial featuring Namie herself.

Charts 
The single opened at #2 with 200,610 copies sold in its first week, it sold about 500,000 units and charted for 10 weeks. It was the 43rd best-selling single of 1999. The single was certified platinum by the RIAJ for more than 400,000 copies shipped to stores.

Track listing 
 "Respect the Power of Love - Straight Run" – 4:21
 "Respect the Power of Love - NYC Uptown remix" – 4:01
 "Respect the Power of Love - Instrumental" – 4:17

Personnel 
 Namie Amuro – vocals

Production 
 Producer – Tetsuya Komuro
 Additionally Production –  Rob Arbittier & Gary Adante
 Mixing – Eddie Delena
 Remixing – Roland Clark

TV performances 
 March 12, 1999 – Music Station
 March 15, 1999 – Hey! Hey! Hey!
 March 23, 1999 – Utaban
 March 27, 1999 – Pop Jam
 March 29, 1999 – Hey! Hey! Hey! Music Awards III
 April 2, 1999 – Music Station Special
 December 27, 1999 – SMAPxSMAP
 December 31, 1999 – 50th Kōhaku Uta Gassen

References 

1999 singles
Namie Amuro songs
Songs written by Tetsuya Komuro
1999 songs
Avex Trax singles
Torch songs